Thomas Maxwell (1792–1864) was an American attorney and politician who served as U.S. Representative from New York.

Thomas, Tom or Tommy Maxwell is also the name of:
 Thomas Maxwell (cricketer) (1903–1970)
 Thomas Maxwell (Jacobite) (died 1693), Scottish soldier
 Tom Maxwell (guitarist) (born 1968), American guitarist for the bands Knives Out! and Hellyeah
 Tom Maxwell (singer) (born 1965), American songwriter, musician, vocalist, and writer, former lead singer of the Squirrel Nut Zippers
 Tom Maxwell (officer), officer in the Royal Air Force 
 Sturdy Maxwell (Thomas Maxwell,  1920s), Scottish footballer 
 Tommy Maxwell (born 1947), American football player
 Tommy Maxwell (ice hockey) (born 1985), American ice hockey right winger